The 2009–10 season was Livingston's first season back in the Third Division. They also competed in the Challenge Cup, League Cup and the Scottish Cup.

Overview
Livingston went into administration on 24 July 2009 as the club was unable to pay bills of £330,000 in rent. The club previously went into administration in 2004. Despite a takeover the First Division club were deemed to be in breach of SFL rules and were relegated to the Scottish Third Division. The club appealed the decision which led to refusal to play their new third division fixtures whilst it was heard. The appeal to the SFL upheld the original decision. On 7 September 2009 a further appeal to the SFA was dismissed. Livingston won the Third Division by 15 points over nearest team Forfar Athletic. Chairman Gordon McDougall apologised to the other clubs in the division saying that It wasn’t our choice to have players on First Division wages in the Third Division and it was distinctly unfair that a full-time club was thrust upon the others clubs in the division.

Results & fixtures

Friendlies

Third Division

Challenge Cup

League Cup

Scottish Cup

Statistics

Squad 

 
 

                                                                    
    
  
  
      

 
 
 
 

 
|}

Disciplinary record
Includes all competitive matches.

League table

References

Livingston
Livingston F.C. seasons